Genesis Live in London 1980 is a short concert film by the progressive rock band Genesis. It was filmed by the BBC at the Lyceum Theatre in London on 7 May 1980, but was not released until 2007 (which saw only a partial release). The show features the band performing live during the Duke tour. DVDs of the full show have been widely available for a number of years and are of generally less-than-standard DVD quality and some even have tracks missing, most frequently "The Knife". A 39-minute remastered excerpt from this concert was included on the DVD of the 2007 re-issue of Duke in higher quality and is the only officially released version to date; this re-issue was originally part of the Genesis 1976–1982 box set.

On 3 March 2023, the concert will receive its first mostly-complete official release as part of the BBC Broadcasts boxset.

Track list

2007 Duke DVD release 

 "Behind the Lines" - 5:23
 "Duchess" - 7:01
 "Guide Vocal" - 1:26
 "In the Cage" - 7:32
 "Afterglow" - 4:39
 "Dance on a Volcano" - 5:31
 "Los Endos" - 7:18

2023 CD release 
 "Deep in the Motherlode"
 "Dancing with the Moonlit Knight [Excerpt]"
 "The Carpet Crawlers" 
 "One for the Vine/The Story of Albert"
 "Behind the Lines"
 "Duchess"
 "Guide Vocal"
 "Turn It On Again"
 "Duke's Travels"
 "Duke's End"
 "Say It's Alright Joe"
 "The Lady Lies"
 "Ripples..."
 Medley:
 "In The Cage"
 "The Colony of Slippermen (Part C: The Raven)"
 "Afterglow"
 "Follow You Follow Me"
 "I Know What I Like (In Your Wardrobe)"
 "The Knife" [Abridged version]

Full concert setlist
The full setlist for the concert on 7 May 1980 is as follows:
 
 "Deep in the Motherlode"
 "Dancing with the Moonlit Knight [Excerpt]"
 "The Carpet Crawlers" 
 "Squonk"
 "One for the Vine/The Story of Albert"
 "Behind the Lines"
 "Duchess"
 "Guide Vocal"
 "Turn It On Again"
 "Duke's Travels"
 "Duke's End"
 "Say It's Alright Joe"
 "The Lady Lies"
 "Ripples..."
 Medley:
 "In The Cage"
 "The Colony of Slippermen (Part C: The Raven)"
 "Afterglow"
 "Follow You Follow Me"
 "Dance on a Volcano" / "Drum Duet"
 "Los Endos"
 "I Know What I Like (In Your Wardrobe)"
 "The Knife" [Abridged version]

Personnel
Genesis
 Phil Collins – lead vocals, drums, percussion, drum machine
 Mike Rutherford – 12-string rhythm guitar, lead guitar, bass, backing vocals
 Tony Banks – keyboards, synthesisers, backing vocals

with:
 Daryl Stuermer – lead guitar, bass
 Chester Thompson – drums, percussion

External links
 

Genesis (band) video albums
2007 video albums
Live video albums
2000s English-language films